Multiple resistance may refer to:

 Multiple drug resistance
 including Antimicrobial resistance